Duża Wólka  is a village in the administrative district of Gmina Grębocice, within Polkowice County, Lower Silesian Voivodeship, in south-western Poland.

Notable residents
 Martha Remmert (1853–1941), German classical pianist, music educator, conductor and music writer

References

Villages in Polkowice County